The 1986 Kansas City Royals season  the 18th season in Royals franchise history, and they entered the season as the defending World Series champions. It involved the Royals finishing 3rd in the American League West with a record of 76 wins and 86 losses.

Regular season

Season standings

Record vs. opponents

Notable transactions
March 28, 1986: Joe Beckwith was released by the Kansas City Royals.
May 21, 1986: Mark Huismann was traded by the Royals to the Seattle Mariners for Terry Bell.
June 2, 1986: 1986 Major League Baseball draft
Bo Jackson was drafted by the Royals in the 4th round.
Torey Lovullo was drafted by the Royals in the 27th round, but did not sign.
August 16, 1986: Jacob Brumfield was signed as a free agent by the Royals.

Notable events
July 15, 1986:  Dick Howser is relieved as Royals' manager after managing for the AL in the 1986 Major League Baseball All-Star Game.  Howser admitted he felt sick before the game and was having trouble with signals during the game.  He is later diagnosed with brain cancer and undergoes surgery.  Mike Ferraro takes over as manager for the remainder of the season.

Roster

Player stats

Batting

Starters by position
Note: Pos = position; G = Games played; AB = At bats; H = Hits; Avg. = Batting average; HR = Home runs; RBI = Runs batted in

Other batters
Note: G = Games played; AB = At bats; H = Hits; Avg. = Batting average; HR = Home runs; RBI = Runs batted in

Pitching

Starting pitchers 
Note: G = Games pitched; IP = Innings pitched; W = Wins; L = Losses; ERA = Earned run average; SO = Strikeouts

Other pitchers 
Note: G = Games pitched; IP = Innings pitched; W = Wins; L = Losses; ERA = Earned run average; SO = Strikeouts

Relief pitchers 
Note: G = Games pitched; W = Wins; L = Losses; SV = Saves; ERA = Earned run average; SO = Strikeouts

Awards and honors
 George Brett, Lou Gehrig Award
 Dennis Leonard, Hutch Award

Farm system

References

1986 Kansas City Royals at Baseball Reference
1986 Kansas City Royals at Baseball Almanac

Kansas City Royals seasons
Kansas City Royals
Kansas City